Marilyn Lee Lake,  (born 5 January 1949) is an Australian historian known for her work on the effects of the military and war on Australian civil society, the political history of Australian women and Australian racism including the White Australia Policy and the movement for Aboriginal and Torres Strait Islander human rights. She was awarded a personal chair in history at La Trobe University in 1994. She has been elected a Fellow, Australian Academy of the Humanities and a Fellow, Academy of the Social Sciences in Australia.

Her research interests include Australian history; nation and nationalism; gender, war and citizenship; femininity and masculinity; history of feminism; race, gender and imperialism; global and trans-national history.

Early life and education
Marilyn Lee Calvert was born 5 January 1949 in Hobart, Tasmania. On 5 October 1968 she married Sam (Philip Spencer) Lake. They have two daughters.

She studied history at the University of Tasmania, where she resided at Jane Franklin Hall, and graduated with a Bachelor of Arts on 10 April 1968. That year she submitted her honours thesis, W.A. Wood's and the Clipper, 1903 – 1909. A Study in Radical Journalism, and was awarded Honours which was conferred on 2 April 1969.

On 11 April 1973 she was graduated Master of Arts by the University of Tasmania. Her thesis, on Tasmanian society in World War 1, became her first book, A Divided Society, in 1975.
 
She was graduated a Doctor of Philosophy by Monash University in 1984. Her doctoral thesis, "The limits of hope: soldier settlement in Victoria, 1915–1938" became a book with the same title in 1987.

Career
In 1986, Lake was appointed a lecturer in History and Social Theory at The University of Melbourne.

In 1988, she was appointed Senior Lecturer and made foundational Director of Women's Studies (1988–94) at La Trobe University. In 1991, Lake was appointed Reader in the Faculty of Humanities and Social Sciences, La Trobe University. In 1994 she was elevated to Professor of History, Faculty of Humanities and Social Sciences, La Trobe University with a Personal Chair in History.

In 1997, she was Visiting Professorial Fellow, Stockholm University.

In 2001–2002, she was the Chair of Australian Studies at Harvard University.

Between 2004 and 2008 she was an Australian Research Council Australian Professorial Fellow, La Trobe University.

In 2008, she was a research fellow at the Australian Prime Ministers Centre in Canberra.

In 2011, Lake was awarded another Australian Research Council Professorial Research Fellowship "to investigate the international history of Australian democracy. She will research both the impact of Australian democratic innovation – manhood suffrage, the 8-hour day, the Australian ballot, women's rights – overseas, and Australian engagements with international organisations such as the ILO and United Nations, the translation of new human rights into citizenship rights, at home, in the twentieth century."

In February 2019 Monash University Publishing released Contesting Australian History: Essays in Honour of Marilyn Lake edited by Joy Damousi and Judith Smart. The contents are papers presented at a two-day celebration of Lake's career held at the University of Melbourne in 2016.

Committees and voluntary work
Lake is a former president, Australian Historical Association.

Lake is a member of the reference group of the Australian Women's History Forum.

Lake is a member of the editorial boards of Labor History, Journal of Australian Studies and Social Politics: International Studies in Gender, State and Society, and was a member of the editorial board of Australian Historical Studies between 2006 and 2009.

Lake was a member of the La Trobe University Council between 1995 and 1997 and of Monash University Council between 1985 and 1989.

She was a Museum Victoria councillor from 1985 to 1989 and a member of the History Council of Victoria between 2001 and 2004.

She served as a member of the Sullivan's Cove Waterfront Authority between 2005 and 2009.

She was a director and board member, Victorian Women's Trust from 2005 to 2009.

Awards and honours
Marilyn Lake has received the following awards and honours:
 1985, The University of Melbourne Harbison-Higinbotham Prize
 1994, Human Rights Non-Fiction Award for Creating a Nation with Patricia Grimshaw, Marian Quartly and Ann McGrath
 1995, elected Fellow, Australian Academy of the Humanities
 1999, elected Fellow, Academy of the Social Sciences in Australia
 2000, awarded Doctor of Letters (honoris causa), University of Tasmania
 2002, Human Rights Arts Non-Fiction Award for Faith: a biography of Faith Bandler
 2003, Centenary Medal
 2008, Queensland Premier's Literary Awards, History Book – Faculty of Arts, University of Queensland Award for Drawing the Global Colour Line (with Henry Reynolds)
 2009, Prime Minister's Literary Award for non-fiction book Drawing the Global Colour Line (with Henry Reynolds)
 2009, The University of Melbourne Ernest Scott Prize for Drawing the Global Line''' (with Henry Reynolds)
 2018, appointed an Officer of the Order of Australia (AO) for "distinguished service to higher education, particularly to the social sciences, as an academic, researcher and author, and through contributions to historical organisations."
2019, NSW Premier's History Awards – General History Prize, shortlisted for Progressive New World: How Settler Colonialism and Transpacific Exchange Shaped American Reform (Harvard University Press).

Major works
 A Divided Society (1975) 
 Double Time: Women in Victoria 150 Years (1985) (co-editor) 
 The Limits of Hope: Soldier Settlement in Victoria 1915–38 (1987) 
 Australians at Work: Commentaries and Sources (1991) (co-editor) 
 Creating a Nation (1994, reprinted 1996, 2000) (jointly) 
 Getting Equal: The History of Australian Feminism (1999) 
 Faith Bandler Gentle Activist (2002) 
 Connected Worlds: History in Transnational Perspective (2006) 
 Memory, Monuments and Museums (2006) 
 Drawing the Global Colour Line (2008) with Henry Reynolds 
 What's Wrong with ANZAC? The Militarisation of Australian History (2010) with Henry Reynolds 
 Progressive New World: How Settler Colonialism and Transpacific Exchange Shaped American Reform (2019)

References

External links
Staff profile at the University of Melbourne website.

1949 births
Living people
Australian women historians
Fellows of the Academy of the Social Sciences in Australia
Fellows of the Australian Academy of the Humanities
History of Indigenous Australians
Academic staff of La Trobe University
Monash University alumni
Officers of the Order of Australia
People from Hobart
Academic staff of the University of Melbourne
University of Melbourne women
University of Tasmania alumni